"Eazy Sleazy" is a song by Rolling Stones frontman Mick Jagger and Dave Grohl. It was surprise-released 13 April 2021 through Polydor Records. Jagger conceived the single during the COVID-19 pandemic and collaborated with drummer Dave Grohl and producer Matt Clifford virtually. "Eazy Sleazy" is an upbeat, "muscular, melodic" hard rock song. So far the song is only available on YouTube.

Writing and recording 
"Eazy Sleazy" was written initially by Jagger during March 2021 while watching coverage of the COVID-19 pandemic.

Lyrics
The song's lyrics describe life during the COVID-19 pandemic and common frustrations, including misinformation relating to the pandemic. The lyrics mention TikTok dances, Zoom video conferencing, and Bill Gates conspiracy theories. "Eazy Sleazy"'s chorus is deliberately optimistic for a post-pandemic future, with Jagger singing "It's gonna be a garden of earthly delights" and "It'll be a memory you're trying to remember to forget".

Critical reception 
NME's Tom Skinner referred to "Eazy Sleazy" as an "infectious rock team-up", while Variety editor Jem Aswad referred to it as a "pandemic anthem" and "punky song" that is "the liveliest thing Jagger has released in many years". The Guardian's Ben Beaumont-Thomas found the track "amusing", stating that it railed "against the boredom of lockdowns" during the pandemic.

Personnel 
 Mick Jagger – lead vocals, rhythm guitar
 Dave Grohl – drums, lead guitar, bass guitar, backing vocals

References 

2021 singles
2021 songs
Mick Jagger songs
Songs written by Mick Jagger
Songs written by Dave Grohl
Songs about the COVID-19 pandemic